The Auas Mountains (Auasberge in German) is the highest mountain range in Namibia. Located near Windhoek, the range is 56 kilometers long, and is rich in flora and fauna. Moltkeblick  is the highest peak in the range, and the second highest in the country.

References

Mountains of Namibia
Khomas Region